Rohrmoos-Untertal is a former municipality in the district of Liezen in Styria, Austria. Since the 2015 Styria municipal structural reform, it is part of the municipality Schladming.

Mining (historic) 
In the mountains to the south of the municipality (Zinkwand, Vetternspitze), mining was carried out, mainly for silver, nickel and zinc.

(Mining from the early Middle Ages to the 19th century; see at List of show mines)

References

Cities and towns in Liezen District